Bolugh (also Romanized as Bolūgh; also known as Bolūk and Buluk) is a village in Zanjanrud-e Pain Rural District, Zanjanrud District, Zanjan County, Zanjan Province, Iran. At the 2006 census, its population was 36, in 7 families.

References 

Populated places in Zanjan County